Sir John Edwards, 1st Baronet may refer to:
 Sir John Bryn Edwards, 1st Baronet (1889–1922), Welsh ironmaster
 Sir John Edwards, 1st Baronet, of Garth (1770–1850), Welsh politician